The Central Institute of Technology Kokrajhar (CITK) is a public technical university established in 2006 and owned by the Government of India. It is located in Kokrajhar, Assam, India. The institute is spread across  in Kokrajhar and offers Bachelor of Technology (B.Tech.), Bachelor of Design (B.Des.), Master of Technology (M.Tech.), Master of Design (M.Des.), PhD, and Diploma programs in various disciplines.

History
The Institute was established on 19 December 2006. The genesis of this Institute was the memorandum of Settlement on Bodoland Territorial Council (BTC) signed between the Assam Government, the Government of India and the Bodo Liberation Tigers Force, on 10 February 2003, in New Delhi. The Institute is an autonomous body registered under the Societies Registration Act, 1860 and functions under a Board of Governors (BOG). The Institute is declared as a Deemed University by University Grants Commission (UGC) and Ministry of Human Resource Development (MHRD) with the recommendation  from Central Government under "De-Novo" category on 13 December 2018.

Departments

The institute has the following departments offering both diploma and degree programs:
 Civil engineering
 Computer Science & Engineering
 Electronics & Communication Engineering
 Food Engineering and Technology
 Instrumentation Engineering
 Multimedia Communication and Design
 Allied Engineering
 Basic Science
 Humanities and Social Science

Facilities 
There are 3 Boys' and 1 Girls' Hostel inside the campus with capacity to accommodate around 1100 Boys and 250 girls. However to accommodate the newly admitted girls the institute has arranged 2 rented house outside the campus and new Hostels are being constructed. Due to the constraints faced by the students especially the outstation students to find accommodation in the town, the Institute is making arrangements for opening more hostels for both boys and girls.

Academics

Rankings
Central Institute of Technology, Kokrajhar was ranked in the 251–300 band among all engineering colleges in India by the National Institutional Ranking Framework (NIRF) in 2021.

References

External links 
 

Engineering colleges in Assam
Bodoland
Education in Kokrajhar district
Educational institutions established in 2006
2006 establishments in Assam